Paul Emmanuel is a South African artist best known for his prints, drawings and installations. Born in 1969 in Kabwe, Zambia, Emmanuel graduated from the University of the Witwatersrand, Johannesburg in 1993, with a BA Fine Art. Emmanuel currently lives and works in Johannesburg.

Artwork

Artistic practice 
Paul Emmanuel is an artist and printmaker who employs various media including photography and film, to address issues of identity, particularly as a white male living in post-apartheid South Africa. The content of his oeuvre deals with a construct of gender, memory and loss. Emmanuel was professionally trained as a printmaker, specialising in lithography. Emmanuel employs his perceptual and technical skills to create photo-realistic drawings. In his drawings he employs a technique using a blade to scratch into the surface of exposed photographic paper and removes layers of the surface revealing tones in the paper in his drawing. His approach is from dark to light.  Emmanuel has produced a non-narrative award-winning experimental film artwork.

Major projects

Transitions 
Transitions is the artist's project comprising an internationally touring museum exhibition of drawings and a short film (3SAI: A Rite of Passage). As well as suite of maniere noir lithographs titled "Transitions Multiples" exhibited in 2011 at Goya Contemporary Gallery, Baltimore and as the featured exhibition on the 2011 FNB Joburg Art Fair. Transitions explores liminal moments in shifting white male identity, memory and loss.

The Transitions Project comprises the following three elements:

Transitions – an internationally touring museum solo exhibition comprising a series of five original drawings obsessively hand incised into exposed & processed photographic paper – each capturing sequences of transitory life stages. Included in the show is a looped projection of the short film 3SAI: A Rite of Passage.
3SAI: A RRite of Passage – a cross-platform, cinematic non-narrative experimental short film
Transitions Multiples – a suite of editioned maniere noir lithographs.

The Lost Men 
The Lost Men is an ongoing project comprises a series of temporary, site-specific installations, which engage with concepts of memorial and public grief. Emmanuel researches the history and relevance of the selected public site. The artwork he creates re-evaluates events related to South African history; it is his personal response from a contemporary viewpoint to a particular place and its historical significance. Each artwork is unique in imagery, structure and format while the project remains conceptually consistent. The installations are installed for a defined period only. Emmanuel uses his own body as his ‘canvas’ and imprints into his skin, using lead type that results in temporary bruising, the names of deceased servicemen killed in action. The artist’s marked body is photographed and the images re-printed onto large, semi-transparent silk banners which are placed in the landscape, acting as a ‘counter memorial’. It is a non-partisan, ‘counter-memorial’ that reflects on impermanence and forgetting. The Lost Men has been selected by the government of France as an official exhibit of the World War One Centennial.

The phases of the Lost Men Project implemented during 2004–2014 are:
phase 1: The Lost Men Grahamstown, South Africa (2004)
phase 2: The Lost Men Mozambique (2007)
phase 3: The Lost Men France (2014)

Solo exhibitions and public installations 
Paul Emmanuel’s first solo exhibition was in 2000, titled Pages from Cathexis at the Open Window Contemporary Art Gallery in Pretoria. The exhibition included lithographs, etchings and an artist's book. The exhibition had an extended display of lithographic and etching equipment.  Printmaking workshops were also help in the gallery and were supported by the National Arts Council of South Africa. REF
Recent solo exhibitions include Emmanuel's 2014 Lost Men, France site specific installation at the Thiepval Memorial France., Transitions Multiples exhibited at the Goya Contemporary Gallery, Baltimore, USA and at the FNB Jo'burg Art Fair, where Emmanuel was selected as the featured artist in 2011
Other key national and international solo exhibitions include Transitions, exhibited at the Smithsonian National Museum of African Art in Washington, D.C., in 2010. The Lost Men Mozambique in 2007, After Image at University of Stellenbosch Art Gallery in 2005 and The Lost Men exhibited at the National Arts Festival in Grahamstown.

Group exhibitions
Emmanuel has also been included in group shows throughout South Africa as well as internationally. His most recent group exhibitions include DOING HAIR at the Wits Art Museum in Johannesburg, South Africa., "TOUCH ME" at France South Africa Seasons 2012 to 2013 and The Art of Banking: Celebrating through Collections group show at the Standard Bank Gallery in Johannesburg.

Film screenings and awards 
3SAI: A RITE OF PASSAGE has been selected and screened at 14 film festivals internationally. The cross-platform, cinematic non-narrative experimental short film has won several awards and nominations. 3SAI was nominated for the best experimental short film in 2011 at the 9th In the Palace International Short Film Festival in Balchik, Bulgaria, won best Experimental Film at the Sardinia International Film Festival in Italy in 2010 and in 2009 won best short film at the 4th Africa-in-Motion Short Film Competition at Edinburg International.

Awards and fellowships 
Paul Emmanuel has been awarded the following key awards and fellowships among others. In 1997 The Ampersand Foundation named Emmanuel the first recipient of the prestigious Ampersand Fellowship for its New York Residency and in 2008 Emmanuel won the Sasol Wax in Art Competition in South Africa.
Emmanuel was selected as Featured Artist exhibiting his solo exhibition TRANSITIONS MULTIPLES at the FNB Jo’burg Art Fair in 2011 and was awarded the Visas Pour la Creation research residency in Paris, France in 2011 by the Institut Français.

Essays 
Paul Emmanuels' artistic practice and projects have been the topic of many essays and journal articles. These include Dominic Thorburn's Borderline, Sweeping a Mind Field, Prof. Emerita's, Pamela Allara, Diane Victor and Paul Emmanuel: Lost Men Lost Wor(l)ds- Gender and South African Art in African Arts, Pamela Allara, Paul Emmanuel’s Transitions: The White South African Male in Process,  Irene Enslé Bronner, Intimate Masculinities in the Work of Paul Emmanuel, Robyn Sassen, Under Covers: South Africa’s Apartheid Army – an Incubator for Artists’ Books, Julia Charlton, Drawing out of the Darkness and Karen von Veh, The Politics of Memory in South African Art.

Publications 
Annette Becker, Voir La Grande Guerre, Un Autre Recit, 1914–2014.
2014 Centenaire De La: Premiere Guerre Mondiale. Page 54.

References 

University of the Witwatersrand alumni
Kabwe
South African artists
1969 births
Living people